Allardt is a city in Fentress County, Tennessee, United States. The population was 555 at the 2020 census. The current mayor Ms. Patricia (Pat) Brown Clark was elected in 2018. According to the city charter, there are three city council board members, currently (as of 2018) Chris Crabtree, Thomas Potter, and Michael Wiley.

History

After 1880, Frederick Allardt and Bruno Gernt brought a group of Germans from Michigan to settle in the area. The town was incorporated in 1964.

Geography
The city is situated atop the western Cumberland Plateau in a relatively broad area surrounded by rugged hills. Tennessee State Route 52 passes roughly west-to-east through the city, connecting it with Jamestown to the northwest and Rugby to the east. State Route 296 intersects State Route 52 near the center of Allardt, and continues directly westward to U.S. Route 127.

Colditz Cove State Natural Area, best known for the  Northrup Falls, lies just southeast of Allardt.  The Big South Fork National River and Recreation Area lies a few miles to the northeast.

Demographics

2020 census

As of the 2020 United States census, there were 555 people, 266 households, and 171 families residing in the city.

2000 census
As of the census of 2000, there were 642 people, 259 households, and 197 families residing in the city.  The population density was 170.0 people per square mile (65.6/km2).  There were 283 housing units at an average density of 74.9 per square mile (28.9/km2).  The racial makeup of the city was 98.91% White, 0.16% Native American, 0.16% Asian, and 0.78% from two or more races. Hispanic or Latino of any race were 0.31% of the population.

There were 259 households, out of which 31.3% had children under the age of 18 living with them, 64.5% were married couples living together, 9.7% had a female householder with no husband present, and 23.9% were non-families. 21.2% of all households were made up of individuals, and 10.0% had someone living alone who was 65 years of age or older.  The average household size was 2.48 and the average family size was 2.85.

In the city, the population was spread out, with 22.7% under the age of 18, 6.1% from 18 to 24, 26.0% from 25 to 44, 25.9% from 45 to 64, and 19.3% who were 65 years of age or older.  The median age was 42 years. For every 100 females, there were 92.8 males.  For every 100 females age 18 and over, there were 87.2 males.

The median income for a household in the city was $34,412, and the median income for a family was $35,938. Males had a median income of $27,333 versus $18,929 for females. The per capita income for the city was $18,382.  About 7.6% of families and 9.5% of the population were below the poverty line, including 16.2% of those under age 18 and 7.4% of those age 65 or over.

Arts and culture

Annual events

On the first Saturday of Every October the town hosts the Great Pumpkin Festival and Weigh-Off, which coincides with world-wide pumpkin weigh-off.

Climate
The climate in this area is characterized by hot, humid summers and generally mild to cool winters.  According to the Köppen Climate Classification system, Allardt has a humid subtropical climate, abbreviated "Cfa" on climate maps.

References

Cities in Tennessee
German-American culture in Tennessee
Cities in Fentress County, Tennessee